Paulianosia is a monotypic moth genus in the subfamily Arctiinae. Its single species, Paulianosia clathrata, is found on Madagascar. Both the genus and species were first described by Hervé de Toulgoët in 1958.

References

Lithosiini